The Baliwag Municipal Library and Museum (also referred to as the Tahanan ng Kasaysayan at Kalinangan ng Baliwag) which is currently housed at the Lumang Munisipyo (Old Municipal Town Hall) is the town's center for historical and cultural heritage.

Theis landmark is owned and administered by the City of Baliwag. The heritage-historic Filipino-colonial mansion Bahay na Bato the official repository (established in 1998 as a natural history and ethnography museum) of Baliwag and Bulacan province.

Baliwag Museo is located in Town Proper, Old Municipal Bldg., Cagayan Valley Road, Poblacion, Baliwag, Bulacan in the Republic of the Philippines, It is 150 meters from the heritage St. Augustine Parish Church of Baliuag.

The century-old Museo ng Baliwag is administered by Jesusa Garcia Villanueva who serves as the curator for the Museum and officer-in-charge for the Library since July 2017.

History
Baliwag, Bulacan was the first Municipio ever created during the American regime in the Philippines, on May 6, 1899, five days before the fateful "Sabang Battle".

In the History of the Philippines (1521–1898), Roman Catholicism in the Philippines, Baliwag had 30 curates. Fr. Esteban Diez Hidalgo and Fr. Fausto Lopez served 40 and 24 years, respectively. Fr. Lopez had 6 children with a beautiful native, Mariquita Amparo: Soledad, Rita, Carmen, Dr. Joaquin Gonzalez (politician), Francisco, the former Assemblyman Ricardo Lloret Gonzales (Legislative districts of Bulacan, 5th Philippine Legislature), and Jose the eldest who was widely known as “Pepeng Mariquita". Spanish cura parroco, Fr. Ysidoro Prada served in Baliwag during the last decade of Spaniard regime.

Mariquita's family owned the biggest house in Baliwag which occupied a big block. Her son, Dr. Joaquin Gonzalez practiced medicine. In his lucrative profession, he treated patients in his clinic located inside their big ancestral mansion across the old Municipal Building traversing the National Highway. This landmark house was later used and became the Old Municipal Building (now the Museo ng Baliwag).

The Philippine-American civil and military authorities supervised the first municipal elections, having chosen Baliwag as the site of the first Philippine elections of May 7, 1899. The Filipinos gathered at the plaza of the St. Augustine Parish Church of Baliuag after the Holy Mass, and thereafter the officials were selected based on the qualifications for voters set by the Americans.

The first town Gobernadorcillo (1789 title) of Baliwag was Capitan Jose de Guzman. He was assisted by the Tribunal's teniente mayor (chief lieutenant), juez de ganadas (judge of the cattle), juez de sementeras (judge of the field) and juez de policia  (judge of the police).

In the History of the Philippines (1521–1898), the 1893 Maura Law, the title of Gobernadorcillo became "capitan municipal" and that of each juez to teniente. From Baliwag's independence from Quingua, now Plaridel, Bulacan to 1898, 49 served as capitan, 13 alcalde and 92 as Gobernadorcillo. Felix de Lara (1782) and Agustin de Castro (1789) were the 1st alcalde and Gobernadorcillo, respectively. Municipal President Fernando Enrile, in 1908 honored some of these officials, even naming some of Baliwag calles in their honor, later. But all these political officials remained under the thumbs and the habito, of the autocratic Augustinian friars, the Baliuag Kura Parokos.

Principalias or town castles, in the Hispanization of Baliwag, became the home of the rich and famous, who sported the titles of Don or Capitan (shrewd, hard-bargaining businessman, the highly successful professionals and even the parvenus, nouveaux riche).

The local government of Baliwag used as first Municipio under the American regime (History of the Philippines (1898–1946)) the Mariano Yoyongko (Gobernadorcillo in 1885) Principalia in Poblacion (now a part of the market site), which it bought from Yoyongko.

On September 15, 1915, Baliwag municipality bought the heritage mansion and lot of Dr. Joaquin Gonzalez (politician). The Gonzalez old mansion served as Lumang Munisipyo (the Old Municipio or Town Hall Building, as seat of the local government) for 65 years.

Renovation and inauguration

In 1971, Baliwag Mayor Florentino Vergel de Dios constructed a new municipal building. Accordingly, the Baliwag Tourism Council and Baliwag Historical Society's Mr. Rolando E. Villacorta suggested the conversion of the historic house into a Library-Museum.

In 1993, Baliwag Alkalde Carling Trinidad, Cong. Pedro Pancho with the assistance of Guillermina T. Gabor started the reconstruction of the Gonzalez mansion.

Mayor Rolando Salvador, on August 9, 1998, accepted the renovate Building as part of municipal government property. Baliwag Tourism Council, Gemma Cruz-Araneta (Secretary of Department of Tourism (Philippines)) and Bulacan Governor Josefina M. dela Cruz were present at the formal inauguration of the Library-Museum turnover to the LGU of Baliwag.

The historic turnover was highlighted by a "Buntal Hat Dance" (by Rene Plamenco, Soledad Cruz, Eliseo Gonzalez and Brgy. Captain Elizabeth Agtarap) and "Sayaw sa Nayon". The momentous event was witnessed by Rustan's Justa Tantoco, Bulacan former Vice Governor Willie Villarama and Tesie Villarama, under the watch of Mayor Rolando Salvador and Evelyn  C. Salvador. Antonio Cabangon Chua, Baliwag business mogul also graced the turnover.

Description

The contemporary Baliwag's Museo houses on its ground floor the Baliwag community affairs and tourism office of incumbent Ms. Rosie Q. Bautista, Balibuntal Enterprises Officer. Incidentally, Baliwag's Buntal Hat Festival of 2012 was held with its 279th founding anniversary on May 26, 2012.

On the second floor of the Museo is the Silid-Aklatang Francisco Guerrero Library-Museum which has several Bulwagan. The First local election in the Philippines took place on May 6, 1899, with the election of Francisco Guerrero, the first Baliwag municipal president who held office in the house of Dr. Joaquin Gonzales, the Old Municipio, now the Museo ng Baliwag.

Aside from the Bulwagang Guerrero are: Mariano Ponce, Bert Marcelo, Alfonso Enrile (father of Juan Ponce Enrile), Roman C. Carreon, sculptor and artist and "Pepita" - Josefa Tiongson y Lara Bulwagan (JOCELYNANG BALIUAG, Kundiman). The slain Mayor Servando "Bandong" Santos' gun, memorabilia is at the side of the dining and reception halls.

Image gallery

Exterior

Interior

Literature 

"Catalogo Bio-Bibliographico de los Religiosos Agustinos de la Provincia del Santisimo Nombre de Jesus de las Islas Filipinas Desde su Fundacion hasta Nuestros Dias" by Elviro Jorde Perez. 1901, Manila. Estab. Tipo. De Colegio de Santo Tomas.
"Apuntes históricos de la provincia augustiniana del Santísimo Nombre de Jesús de Filipinas", año 1909: Filipinas, by P. Bernardo Martinez.
Baliuag: Then and Now, by Roland E. Villacorte, Philippine Graphic Arts, Inc., Caloocan, 1970, 1985 * 2001 editions. pp. 5–111, 353-360 (2001 edition); and pp. 274–6; 392-396 (1985 edition).
"Baliuag! then and now", by Rolando E. Villacorte, Published 1970 by Printed by Philippine Graphic Arts in Caloocan, Library of Congress DS689.B23 V55 409 pages Open Library OL5327794M
"Baliuwag, Lunduyan ng mga Bayani", Baliuag Tourism Council, 2008, Municipality of Baliuag, 2008 Edition, pp. 10–120.

See also 
St. Augustine Parish Church of Baliuag
List of museums in the Philippines
International Council of Museums
International Museum Day (May 18)
Museum education
Virtual Library museums pages

Most visited museums

Notes

External links 

1998 establishments in the Philippines
Art museums and galleries in the Philippines
Government buildings completed in 1915
Buildings and structures in Bulacan
Heritage Houses in the Philippines
Historic house museums in the Philippines
Landmarks in the Philippines
Museums established in 1998
Museums in the Philippines
Libraries in the Philippines
Natural history museums in the Philippines
Neoclassical architecture in the Philippines
History of the Philippines (1565–1898)
Tourist attractions in Bulacan
20th-century architecture in the Philippines